Paul Thureau-Dangin (14 December 1837 – 24 February 1913), member of the Académie française (1893, later Perpetual Secretary), was a historian of the reign of Louis-Philippe and also of the revival of Catholic thought (in the Roman Catholic Church and the Church of England) in nineteenth century Britain.

Thureau-Dangin reconciled his liberal Catholic position with support for republican ideals.

He died in Paris on 24 February 1913.

Works or publications
Monarchie de juillet, 1984.
Revised and edited English translation of La renaissance catholique en Angleterre au XIXe siècle in two volumes.

References

External links
 
 

1837 births
1913 deaths
Writers from Paris
French Roman Catholics
French republicans
19th-century French historians
20th-century French historians
Members of the Académie Française
French male non-fiction writers
Members of the Ligue de la patrie française
Burials at Montparnasse Cemetery
Chevaliers of the Légion d'honneur